János Gyáni (born 25 February 1959) is a Hungarian judoka. He competed at the 1980 Summer Olympics and the 1988 Summer Olympics.

References

External links
 

1959 births
Living people
Hungarian male judoka
Olympic judoka of Hungary
Judoka at the 1980 Summer Olympics
Judoka at the 1988 Summer Olympics
People from Gyula
Sportspeople from Békés County
20th-century Hungarian people